is a song by Japanese musician Ringo Sheena, which acted as one of the promotional songs from her fourth album Sanmon Gossip in 2009. The song was produced by Sheena's former Tokyo Jihen bandmate Masayuki Hiizumi, and was a collaboration with Hiizumi's jazz ensemble Pe'z, as well as hip-hop group Maboroshi members Daisuke "Mummy-D" Sakama and Tomoyasu Takeuchi.

Background and development 

In 2007, Sheena resumed releasing music under her solo name, after working as a member of Tokyo Jihen since 2004. She released the soundtrack album Heisei Fūzoku in February, a project where she collaborated with composer Neko Saito to create music for the Mika Ninagawa-directed film Sakuran. In September of the same year, Tokyo Jihen released their third album, Variety, a project album featuring members other than vocalist Sheena composing the album's music. After their 2007 Spa & Treatment tour, this began a two-year period of inactivity for the band. In November 2008 to celebrate her 10th as a solo musician, Sheena held a series of three concerts at the Saitama Super Arena, Sheena Ringo (Nama) Ringo-han '80: Jūshūnen kin'en-sai.

Sheena began developing her fourth solo studio album in 2009. Sanmon Gossip was a collection of songs she did not think would work for her releases with Tokyo Jihen for stylistic reasons.

On May 27, Sheena released a single called "Ariamaru Tomi", which was used as the drama Smile'''s theme song. This song was commercially successful, being certified gold by the RIAJ in three different media.

Three months before the release of Sanmon Gossip, Sheena collaborated with Maboroshi on the song "Amai Yamai" from their third album Maboroshi no Shi.

 Writing and production 

The song featured an arrangement produced by Masayumi Hiizumi a member of jazz ensemble Pe'z, and the former pianist for Tokyo Jihen from 2004 until 2005. Fellow Pe'z members Kou and Masahiro Nirehara also perform in the song. The two members of hip-hop group Maboroshi feature in the song: rapper Daisuke "Mummy-D" Sakama, and guitarist Tomoyasu Takeuchi.

Sheena wrote the song in order to explore the notion that industry leaders were typically male, noting that fashion industry leaders tended to be male while consumers female. Rapper Daisuke "Mummy-D" Sakama added his rap after Sheena had finished writing her sections. She requested that he write about fashion and sexuality.

 Promotion and release 

On July 1, 2009, Sheena performed the song with Mummy-D during her second special on NHK's music program Songs.

 Music video 

A music video for the song was first unveiled on July 6, 2009, directed by Yuichi Kodama. The video features Mummy-D and Sheena walking on a catwalk, surrounded by monitors that display their faces. The video was compiled on her music video collection Seiteki Healing: Sono Yon, which was released on DVD on August 26, 2009.

 Critical reception 

CDJournal praised the song's "jazzy rock sound", and noted the sensuality in Sheena's voice.

Personnel

Personnel details were sourced from Sanmon Gossip'''s liner notes booklet.

H Zetto M – arrangement, wutlitzer, claps
Kou – drums, claps
Masahiro Nirehara – bass, claps
Daisuke "Mummy-D" Sakama – rap, songwriting, claps
Ringo Sheena – vocals, songwriting, claps
Tomoyasu Takeuchi – guitar, claps

Chart rankings

Release history

References 

2009 songs
Japanese-language songs
Songs written by Ringo Sheena
Music videos directed by Yuichi Kodama
Ringo Sheena songs